Joseph William Hancock (26 November 1876 – 23 May 1939) was an English first-class cricketer who played for Derbyshire from 1897 to 1900 and for Scotland in 1906.

Hancock was born at Old Tupton, Derbyshire, the son of Alfred Hancock, a coal miner, and his wife Eliza. Hancock made his debut for Derbyshire in the 1897 season aged 20.  In May against Lancashire he took 4 wickets at a cost of 140 runs. He played regularly for the next three years. In the 1898 season he achieved his best bowling performance with 5 for 61 against Yorkshire. The 1899 season was Hancock's best for batting, when his average reached 11.43 and he scored 43 not out against Hampshire. Hancock left Derbyshire in 1900 after playing three matches in the 1900 season. He turned out for Scotland in 1906 against the West Indies.

Hancock was a left-arm medium pace bowler and took 94 first-class wickets at an average of 29.73 and a best performance of 5 for 61. He was a left-hand batsman and played 77 innings in 48 first-class matches with an average of 7.91 and a top score of 43 not out.

Hancock died at Clifton, Rotherham, Yorkshire, at the age of 62.

References

1876 births
1939 deaths
Derbyshire cricketers
English cricketers
Scotland cricketers